Ichoria chalcomedusa is a moth of the subfamily Arctiinae. It was described by Herbert Druce in 1893. It is found in the Brazilian states of Santa Catarina and Paraná. It was named after the Greek mythological figure of Chalcomedusa, mother of Laertes.

References

Arctiinae
Moths described in 1893